Georges-Henri Blouin (192127 December 2007) was a Canadian diplomat.

Blouin grew up in Montreal and earned a Master of Law degree from Université de Montréal. In 1949 Blouin joined the Canadian Department of External Affairs.

In 1965 he was appointed Ambassador Extraordinary and Plenipotentiary to Cameroon then concurrently to the Central African Republic, Chad, the Democratic Republic of Congo and Gabon. He was later appointed to Morocco, Spain and then the Netherlands. Later, Blouin became chief of protocol for Brian Mulroney's government.

References

External links 
 Foreign Affairs and International Trade Canada Complete List of Posts 

1921 births
2007 deaths
Ambassadors of Canada to Cameroon
Ambassadors of Canada to the Central African Republic
Ambassadors of Canada to Chad
Ambassadors of Canada to the Democratic Republic of the Congo
Ambassadors of Canada to Gabon
Ambassadors of Canada to Morocco
Ambassadors of Canada to Spain
Ambassadors of Canada to the Netherlands